Ben Koenderink (born July 13, 1990 in North Bay, Ontario) is a Dutch-Canadian pair skater. His current partner is Marylie Jorg. They are the 2009 Dutch Junior pair champions.

Biography
Koenderink previously competed in both pairs & singles but now only competes in pairs. He and former partner Michelle Egli (Canada) were the 2006 Canadian Juvenile pair champions and the 2007 Canadian Pre-Novice pair silver medalists. Koenderink and Egli were coached by Lee Barkell and Jacinthe Larivière. In November 2007 Koenderink & Egli had the Juvenile and Pre-Novice record for Canada until it was surpassed by Tara Hancherow / Paul-Remi Poulin (Juvenile) and Zoey Brown / Ian Beharry(Pre-Novice) later that year. In spring of 2008 Koenderink and Egli ended their partnership and by summer 2008 Ben had moved to Montreal, Quebec to skate with partner Marylie Jorg. Koenderink and Jorg competed at their first JGP this season in Lake Placid and their first Junior Worlds in 2009.

Competitive highlights
Ju. = Juvenile; PN = Pre-novice; N. = Novice; J. = Junior level

Singles

Pairs 
(With Jorg)

(With Egli)

References

External links
Isuresults.com
Tracings.net
Tracings.net
Figureskatingonlnie.info

Living people
Dutch male single skaters
Canadian male single skaters
1990 births
Canadian male pair skaters
Dutch male pair skaters
Canadian people of Dutch descent
Sportspeople from North Bay, Ontario